Spinipogon misahualli is a species of moth of the family Tortricidae. It is found in Napo Province, Ecuador.

The wingspan is about 12 mm. The ground colour of the forewings is pale ochreous creamy, but paler and more pearl glossy postmedially. The suffusions are brownish ochreous and the markings slightly browner with black strigulae. The hindwings are brown.

References

Moths described in 2002
Cochylini